This is a list of lap pools in San Francisco, California.  San Francisco has 44 lap pools.  Only lap pools are included on this list.  Smaller recreational pools and pools in private residential buildings are not included.  There are 5 salt-water pools and 4 outdoor pools.

Public

The San Francisco Recreation & Parks Department has 9 pools.

This is a custom Google Map of all San Francisco public pools, with locations and links to their schedules / closures.

Community Centers

There are 7 community center pools in SF.

Educational Facilities

There are 7 pools at educational facilities.  The USF Koret Center has the only Olympic-size swimming pool in SF.  A 2nd pool at SFSU is being built in the new wellness center.  The Academy of Art University is buying the Concordia-Argonaut Club building and plans to renovate the pool and facilities.

Commercial Athletic Clubs

There are 10 commercial pools in SF.

Private Athletic Clubs
The Olympic Club has 2 indoor chlorine pools, 1 appropriate for Water Polo.
The Concordia-Argonaut Club has 1 indoor chlorine pool.
The Metropolitan Club has 1 indoor salt-water pool.

Hotels

The InterContinental San Francisco has 1 indoor chlorine pool. 
The Palace Hotel has 1 indoor chlorine pool.
The Nikko Hotel has 1 indoor chlorine pool.
Equinox is located in the Four Seasons Hotel and is available to guests.

See also

Aquatic Park Historic District
South End Rowing Club
Sutro Baths
Fleishhacker Pool
La Petite Baleen Swim School

References

Lap pools
San Francisco-related lists
San Francisco